John Attu Mensah was a Ghanaian professional footballer who played as a winger for the Ghana national team. He is the father of Ghanaian international John Mensah.

Club career 
Mensah played for  Cape Coast Ebusua Dwarfs in the 1960s, he later played for Accra Great Olympics in the late 1960s. On 28 July 1969, during an club international match against Great Olympics and Palmeiras during the training tour in Ghana, Attu played the full match and made the assist to Saul Mettle's goal, the equalizer which gave Olympics a draw at the Accra Sports Stadium.

After playing in clubs in Ghana, he moved to England to play for Cambridge United. He was reportedly the first black person to have featured for the Cambridge-based side. He later featured for Norwich City before retiring in the late 1970s.

International career 
At the international level, he played for the Ghana senior team in the 1950s to 1960s winning over 20 International caps for Ghana. He played alongside players like Aggrey Fynn, Dogo Moro, Baba Yara, C.K. Gyamfi (captain) and Edward Acquah.

Personal life 
John Attu Mensah is the father of former Ghanaian international defender and captain John Mensah. Mensah died in June 2021 in the United Kingdom after a short illness.

References 

2021 deaths
Year of birth missing
Association football midfielders
Association football wingers
Ebusua Dwarfs players
Accra Great Olympics F.C. players
Cambridge United F.C. players
Norwich City F.C. players
Ghanaian expatriate footballers
Ghanaian expatriate sportspeople in England
Ghana Premier League players
Ghanaian footballers